Samni Junction railway station is a small railway station in Bharuch district, Gujarat. Its code is SAMN. It serves Vora Samni village. The station consists of two platforms, neither well sheltered. It lacks many facilities including water and sanitation.

Trains

 69195/96 Bharuch–Dahej MEMU

References 

Railway stations in Bharuch district
Vadodara railway division
Railway junction stations in Gujarat